is the fourth album by the Japanese female idol group AKB48. It is a double-album release and was released in Japan on August 15, 2012 by King Records. It sold 1,051,000 copies.

Album information 
The title 1830m reflects the distance from AKB48 Theater in Akihabara to Tokyo Dome, an indoor baseball stadium with over-50,000 capacity where AKB48 had performed for the first time, from August 24 to 26, 2012. It was released in two editions, a regular edition in a special box with a 48-page photobook, a bonus DVD, and a random photo, and a theater edition with 14 alternate covers, a handshake event ticket, and a photo of an AKB48/SKE48/NMB48/HKT48 member chosen at random.

This is the last album to feature Team A member and the group's ace Atsuko Maeda.

Reception 
The album debuted at number one in the Oricon weekly album charts. In August 2012, the album was certified Million by the Recording Industry Association of Japan.

Track listing 
CD1 contains the following first-time studio recordings, which have all been performed on team stages: "First Rabbit", "Miniskirt no Yōsei", "Lemon no Toshigoro", "Ren'ai Sōsenkyo", "Romance Kakurenbo" and B-sides which only appeared on theater editions of their singles which are  "Jung ya Freud no Baai" (from "Give Me Five!"), "Hashire! Penguin" (from "Ue kara Mariko"), "Yasai Uranai" (from "Flying Get"), Anti (from "Everyday, Katyusha"), "Ōgon Center" (from "Sakura no Ki ni Narō") and "Tsubomitachi" (from "Kaze wa Fuiteiru").

CD2 contains sixteen new songs, plus Atsuko Maeda's solo version of "Sakura no Hanabiratachi"

Senbatsu (album) 
Promotional picture (21 members):
 Team A: Haruna Kojima, Mariko Shinoda, Aki Takajo, Minami Takahashi, Atsuko Maeda
 Team K: Tomomi Itano, Ayaka Umeda, Yuko Oshima, Minami Minegishi, Sae Miyazawa, Yui Yokoyama
 Team B: Tomomi Kasai, Yuki Kashiwagi, Rie Kitahara, Mayu Watanabe
 Team 4: Haruka Shimazaki
 Team S: Jurina Matsui, Rena Matsui
 Team N: Sayaka Yamamoto, Miyuki Watanabe
 Team H: Rino Sashihara

Regular Edition 

The DVD contains a set of 2:30 choreography videos (different angles, etc.) for each of the 4 songs.

Theater Edition 
 CD disc 1
Same as on the Regular Edition

 CD disc 2
13 tracks, same as on the Regular Edition minus 4 commercial tie-up tracks: "Daiji na Jikan", "Gū Gū Onaka", "Yasashisa no Chizu", and "Itterasshai".

Charts 
Oricon Chart

Release history

References

External links 
 AKB48 discography 
 AKB48 New Album 1830m - HMV Online 
 Regular Edition - King Records
 Theater Edition - King Records

2012 albums
AKB48 albums
King Records (Japan) albums
Albums produced by Yasushi Akimoto
Japanese-language albums